Ayomán is an extinct language of western Venezuela, once spoken in the village of Siquisique in the state of Lara. Other than being part of the Jirajaran family, its classification is uncertain due to a lack of data.

References

Languages of Venezuela
Extinct languages of South America
Jirajaran languages